Hemmer is a surname. Notable people with the surname include:

Bill Hemmer (born 1964), American television news anchor
Frank Hemmer (born 1963), West German-German slalom canoeist
Hans Ritter von Hemmer, (1869–1931), officer in the Royal Bavarian Army, Knight Commander of the Military Order of Max Joseph
Jarl Hemmer (1893–1944), Finland-Swedish author from Vaasa, Finland
Mari Hemmer (born 1983), Norwegian long-track speedskater
Martin Hemmer, German slalom canoeist who competed in the early 1990s
Pierre Hemmer (1950–2013), Swiss engineer and entrepreneur
Rafael Lozano-Hemmer (born 1967), Mexican-Canadian electronic artist